Tasha Nykyforak (born 24 March 1982) is an Australian netball player. She previously played for the Perth Orioles in the Commonwealth Bank Trophy, and was called up to play for the newly rebranded West Coast Fever in the 2008 ANZ Championship season, replacing injured shooter Tracey Pemberton.

References

1982 births
Living people
Australian netball players
West Coast Fever players
ANZ Championship players
Perth Orioles players
Netball players from Western Australia
West Australian Netball League players